Naas RFC is an Irish rugby club based in Naas, Leinster. They play in division 1B of the All-Ireland League. The club colours are green and white hoops with black shorts and green socks. The Club is the biggest rugby club in Kildare with one of the biggest underage structures in Leinster and 15 LRR referees (May 2022). The club grounds are located at Forenaghts, 2 km to the East of the town.

History
The club was founded in 1881 and reformed in 1922. It was one of the leading Junior Clubs in Irish rugby before attaining All Ireland League Status in the 1999/2000 season. Back then the Club pitches were located in the town in the area where Ashgrove Estate and the Tennis Club are now.  Subsequent travels took the Club to Doyle's Field at Tipper East (where the Paddocks estate is now) with the changing rooms being the jockeys room in Naas Racecourse!

In 1974 he Club purchased land at (its current location) Fournaghts, 2 km to the East of Naas town, with the first games taking place there two years later in 1976. 

In the 2021/22 season, Naas RFC celebrated its 100th continuous season of playing rugby in Naas.

Notable players

 International players associated with the Club
 Mark Deering, Seamus Byrne, Frank Byrne, Philip Lawlor, Geordan Murphy, Jamie Heaslip, Adam Byrne, 
 Ireland national rugby sevens team:
 Fionn Carr, Billy Dardis Jimmy O'Brien (rugby union)
 Ireland U20s Internationals
 Fionn Carr; Adam Byrne; Billy Dardis; Adam Coyle; Jamie Osborne (rugby union), Diarmuid Mangan
 Youth Internationals
 Kevin Cleary Jr, Joseph Moran, Eoghan Conran, Kaylin Domican, David Lynch (captain), Michael Moran, Enda Daly, Colin McEntee, Micheal Skeleton (Captain), Adam Byrne. Maebh Obrien (7's), Erin King . 
 Leinster Youths Representatives
 Dave Conneran, Enda Daly, Michael Moran, Eoghan Conran, Gavin Dooley, Adam Denvir, Kaylin Domican, Rob Campbell, Daniel O'Byrne,  Jared Owens, Adam Byrne, Richard Cronin, Mark Rushe, Joseph Moran, Niall Gorry, Karl Denver, James Morrin, Eoghan Griffin, Colin McEntee, Micheal Skelton, & Adam Coyle, Kevin Mcloughlin and Niall O'Neill . Naas RFC member Patrick Keena was the Manager (2012-2015 ) of the Leinster U18 club side .
 Leinster Girls
 Emily McKeown, Niamh Hederman, Romy Morin, Chantelle Vitoria, Aoife Hederman, Bev Mahon, Aisling Breslin, Maebh Obrien, Nollaig Maguire, Millie Sheridan, Emma Lackey, Mary Healy, Annie Maguire, Ali Miley, Casey O'Brien, Rachel Murtagh, Katie Maguire, Ellen Murray, Katie Ann O’Neill, Erin King

Success at Naas RFC 
 Won the Provincial Towns Cup on 3 occasions – 2005, 1998, 1995 and appeared in the final on 10 occasions (Lost 1926, 1935, 1949, 1952, 1954, 1958, 1982). 
 Won the Cup and Leinster League double in 2005, 1998.
 Won 2 Provincial Towns Plates – 1969 and 1981.
 Provincial 2nd XV Cup – 3 wins, 1996, 1999, 2022
 Anderson Cup - Junior 3rds – 4 wins, 1996, 2002, 2003, 2006, 2014 – joint top winners.
 Dunne Cup  - Junior 4ths – 6 wins (record number), 1980, 1993, 1994, 1999, 2004, 2005. 
 Leinster League Division 1 Champions – 4 wins, 1997/1998, 1999/2000, 2004/2005, 2006/2007.
 ALL IRELAND PROVINCIAL LEAGUE CHAMPIONS – 2000, 2007.
 Hosie Cup (North Midlands J1) – 10 wins, 1981, 1982, 1988, 1992, 1993, 1995, 1998, 1999, 2005, 2007, 2022
 Lalor Cup (North Midladns J2) – 4 wins, 1978, 1995, 1999, 2000.
 Speirs Cup (North Midlands J3) – 4 wins, 1984, 1992, 1993, 1995.
 Scully Cup (North Midlands J4) – 8 wins, 1992, 1993, 1994, 1997, 1998, 2006, 2008, 2011.

References

External links
 Naas RFC

Irish rugby union teams
Rugby clubs established in 1922
Naas
Rugby union clubs in County Kildare
Senior Irish rugby clubs (Leinster)